The ice hockey competitions of the 2022 Winter Olympics was played at two venues located in the Beijing cluster. The Beijing National Indoor Stadium, which seats 18,000, is one of what are being called Olympic Green venues. The Wukesong Arena, seating 10,000, was also used, with both arenas having been constructed for the 2008 Summer Olympics.

The men's tournament had 12 teams competing, and the women's tournament 10 for the first time (an increase of two from 2018). Two events were contested, one each for men and women.

Medal summary

Medal table

Medalists

Venues

Competition schedule

Men's tournament

The tournament featured twelve countries, eight qualifying through the IIHF World Ranking, the host China, and three through qualifying tournaments. The format remained the same as the previous three Olympics; three groups of four compete in three games to determine seeding, each played every other team in their group, followed by four rounds of elimination games. Each group winner received a bye into the second round, along with the highest ranked of the remaining teams. The remaining eight teams played an eliminating qualification game to advance to the quarter-final round. Each quarter-final winner advanced to the semi-finals with the winners playing for the gold medal and the losers playing for the bronze. With the cancellation of the 2020 Men's Ice Hockey World Championships, the groups were established on 24 April 2020, using the IIHF world rankings where seeding counted for the ranking points in unplayed tournaments.

On 10 July 2020, the National Hockey League Players' Association (NHLPA) and National Hockey League agreed to a renewed collective bargaining agreement, which includes a provision opening the possibility for the NHL to explore participation at the 2022 and 2026 Winter Olympics. On 22 July 2021, the NHL released a 2021–22 schedule that included an Olympic break, but the league also announced that a final agreement had not yet been reached regarding Olympic participation of NHL players in 2022. On 3 September 2021, an agreement was made to allow NHL players to compete.

On 22 December 2021, the NHL and the NHLPA announced that NHL players would not be participating in the men's ice hockey tournament at the 2022 Games. COVID-19 has forced a change in the NHL schedule. With approximately 50 games postponed, the NHL was to use the Olympic break to make up its own postponed games rather than have the players compete in the Olympics.

Qualification

Qualification for the men's tournament at the 2022 Winter Olympics was determined by the IIHF World Ranking following the 2019 Men's Ice Hockey World Championships. The top eight joined the hosts and three qualifiers.

Participating nations
The groups were established on 24 April 2020 in absence of a World Championship. Qualifiers one, two, and three, were the winners of the final qualification tournaments. Their designation was determined by their qualification seeding.

Due to the lack of ice hockey talent in China, players had to be recruited from abroad. The men's hockey team had eleven Canadians, nine Chinese, three Americans, and a Russian.

Women's tournament

For the first time ten countries competed in the women's tournament, six qualifying through the IIHF World Ranking, the host China, and three through qualifying tournaments held in November 2021. The qualification groups and schedule will be established at the 2020 IIHF Annual Congress.

Qualification

Qualification for the women's tournament at the 2022 Winter Olympics were supposed to be determined by the IIHF World Ranking following the 2020 Women's Ice Hockey World Championships, but they were cancelled due to the COVID-19 pandemic. The top six ranked nations were established by using their seeding for ranking points in unplayed tournaments in 2020.

Participating nations
Qualifiers Czech Republic, Denmark, and Sweden, were the winners of the final qualification tournaments. Their designation was determined by their qualification seeding.

Qualification summary / Participating NOC's

References

External links
QUALIFICATION SYSTEM FOR XXIV OLYMPIC WINTER GAMES 
Official Results Book – Ice Hockey

Ice hockey at the 2022 Winter Olympics
Ice hockey
2022
Winter Olympics
2022